The brown basilisk (Basiliscus vittatus), also commonly referred to as the striped basilisk or in some areas as the common basilisk, is a species of basilisk lizard in the family Corytophanidae. The species is native to Mexico, Central America and adjacent northwestern Colombia, and has been introduced into the U.S. state of Florida as a feral species. The brown basilisk has large hind feet with narrow flaps of skin on the distal edge of each toe. The fact that they move quickly across the water gives them the appearance of "walking on water".

Description
The male brown basilisk can reach  in total length (including tail), but the female is somewhat smaller. It has a three-part dorsal crest on the head, along the back, and along the tail. Coloration is brown or olive brown with black crossbands. The crossbands are usually only on the flanks and on the dorsal crest. There is also a white stripe, which extends from the eyes to the rear legs. The male has a larger crest than the female.
The brown basilisk weighs . It has long toes with sharp claws.

Etymology and taxonomy
The brown basilisk's generic name Basiliscus is taken from the creature of Greek mythology made up of parts of a rooster, snake, and lion that could turn a man to stone by its gaze: the basilisk. This name derives from the Greek basilískos (βασιλίσκος) meaning "little king". This generic name was given in Carl Linnaeus' 10th edition of Systema Naturae.

Running on water
 
Young brown basilisks can usually run farther than older ones. If the animal faces danger, it starts to run very fast on the surface of a river or a lake. Then the flaps on its hind feet are opened and thus more surface area is provided for it to run on water.

Behavior
Basiliscus vittatus is in the same infraorder as the family Iguanidae. Like most reptiles, the brown basilisk is active during the day. Its outstanding camouflage allows it to remain motionless and very hard to detect. The maximum lifespan of the brown basilisk is probably around 7–8 years. In the wild, most die much sooner.

Reproduction
Female brown basilisks lay about 2–18 eggs, five to eight times a year.

Gallery

References

Further reading
Boulenger GA (1885). Catalogue of the Lizards in the British Museum (Natural History). Second Edition. Volume II. Iguanidæ ... London: Trustees of the British Museum (Natural History). (Taylor and Francis, printers) xiii + 497 pp. + Plates I-XXIV. (Basiliscus vittatus, pp. 109–110).
Wiegmann AF (1828). "Beyträge zur Amphibienkunde ". Isis von Oken 21 (4): 364-383. (Basiliscus vittatus, new species, p. 373). (in German and Latin).

basilisk, brown
basilisk, brown
Reptiles of Colombia
Basiliscus
Reptiles described in 1828
Taxa named by Arend Friedrich August Wiegmann